Designer Brands Inc. is an American company that sells designer and name brand shoes and fashion accessories. It owns the Designer Shoe Warehouse (DSW) store chain, and operates over 500 stores in the United States and an e-commerce website.

The company also owns private-label footwear brands including Audrey Brooke, Kelly & Katie, Lulu Townsend, and Poppie Jones.

History

The company was founded in 1969 as Shonac Corporation, as the shoe licensee for Value City. In July 1991, the company opened its first store, which was in Dublin, Ohio. In 1998, the company was acquired by Value City. By 1999, the company had 48 stores.

In December 2004, the company was acquired by Retail Ventures, an affiliate. In March 2005, the company experienced massive data theft, including customer data from 1.4 million credit card transactions. In June 2005, the company became a public company via an initial public offering. In April 2008, the company launched its e-commerce website.

In 2011, the company acquired Retail Ventures, its largest shareholder. In 2014, the company acquired 44% of Town Shoes, a chain of Canadian shoe stores, and entered into a licensing agreement for the DSW name. In February 2016, the company acquired Ebuys for $62.5 million. In July 2016, the company added shoes for children to its inventory. In August 2016, the company entered into a franchising agreement with Apparel Brands to open DSW stores in the Middle East.

In March 2017, the company reached a deal with Under Armour to carry Under Armour shoes in DSW stores. In June 2017, the company opened a store in Oman, its first store in the Middle East. In May 2018, the company acquired the remaining shares of Town Shoes to obtain complete ownership of the company.

In February 2019, the company announced an addition of nail salons to 5 stores, after testing the concept in 2 stores in Columbus, Ohio. In March 2019, DSW rebranded their corporate name to Designer Brands. The company also changed its ticker symbol on the NYSE from "DSW" to "DBI" effective April 2, 2019.

Entertainer Jennifer Lopez collaborated with the brand to launch the March 2020 line. When the chain closed all its retail stores due to the COVID-19 pandemic, and fashion trends shifted as a result of the increase in remote work, the line was redesigned to include sneakers and comfort shoes.

References

External links

Shoe companies of the United States
Online retailers of the United States
American companies established in 1969
Clothing companies established in 1969
Retail companies established in 1969
Footwear retailers of the United States
Companies based in the Columbus, Ohio metropolitan area
Companies listed on the New York Stock Exchange
1969 establishments in the United States